Arteriosclerosis obliterans is an occlusive arterial disease most prominently affecting the abdominal aorta and the small- and medium-sized arteries of the lower extremities, which may lead to absent dorsalis pedis, posterior tibial, and/or popliteal artery pulses.

It is characterized by fibrosis of the tunica intima and calcification of the tunica media.

See also 
 Arteriosclerosis
 Monckeberg's arteriosclerosis
 Skin lesion

References 

Vascular-related cutaneous conditions